Halishahar Housing Estate is a thana of Chattogram District in Chattogram Division, Bangladesh. Halishahar Housing Estate is a large residential area in Chattogram.

Geography 
Total area of this thana is 9.64 km2 (3.72 sq mi)

Places

Areas

Anandabazar 

Anandabazar is a coastal area located at Halishahar, near Bay of Bengal. As of 2014, the Chittagong Port Authority (CPA) was also starting a process for developing a Bay Terminal on about 1000 acres of land along the coastal area at Anandabazar, near the Port of Chittagong.

Anandabazar post office and Ananda Bazar Government Primary School are also located in this place. There is a bus terminal named Anandabazar Bus Terminal.

Halishahar A-Block

This is one of the largest and densely populated area of Halishahar Thana. It is under 11 No. Ward of Chittagong.

Halishahar B-Block

This is the largest and densely populated area of Halishahar Thana. It is under 26 No. Ward of Chittagong. Most of the people here were migrated from Sandwip. A large number of Bihari people also live here. Halishahar Police Station, North Halishahar Post Office, Baitul Karim Madrasha Complex, Halishahar Public School & College, Halishahar Housing Estate School, Bihari Graveyard, Central Eid-Gah,S-Club Circle E.T.C are situated here.

Halishahar J-Block
 
This is one of the smallest  and not overcrowded area of Halishahar Thana. It is under 11 No. South Kattally Ward (Ctg. City Corporation) of Chittagong. It has only 4 lanes. J Block is situated at east side of Halishahar Housing Estate Field.

Address: J Block, Halishahar Housing Estate, Chittagong, Bangladesh.
Coordinate: 22.3413, 91.7821.

Halishahar H-Block

H block is a relatively smaller area in Halishahar and probably most quieter too. It is adjacent to I block. H block falls under Ward No. 25.

Education

Colleges
Barrister Sultan Ahmed Chowdhury College
City Commerce College
Halishahar Women College

Schools

Ananda Bazar Government Primary School
Asgar Ali Chowdhury Para Primary School
Garib-E-Newaz High School
Gunners' English School
Halishahar Alhaj Mohobbot Ali City Corporation High School
Housing & Settlement Public School  
Rabeya Basari Girl's High School
Halishahar Housing Estet Model Primary School
Halishahr Housing Estet High School
Halishahar Public School and College
Halishahar Cantonment Public School & College
Shaheed Lieutenant General Mushfique Bir Uttam High School
Shah Amanat Shishu Niketan
Silver Bells Kindergarten & Girls' High School

Others 
 Ananda Bazar Shopping Complex

See also 
 Upazilas of Bangladesh
 Districts of Bangladesh
 Divisions of Bangladesh

References 

Thanas of Chittagong District